Cesare Pavese (9 September 1908 – 27 August 1950) was an Italian novelist, poet, short story writer, translator, literary critic, and essayist. He is often referred to as one of the most influential Italian writers of his time.

Early life and education 
Cesare Pavese was born in Santo Stefano Belbo, in the province of Cuneo. It was the village where his father was born and where the family returned for the summer holidays each year. He started primary school  in Santo Stefano Belbo, but the rest of his education was in schools in Turin.

He attended Liceo Classico Massimo d'Azeglio in Turin for his sixth form/senior high school studies. His most important teacher at the time was Augusto Monti, writer and educator, whose writing style attempted to be devoid of all rhetoric.

As a young man of letters, Pavese had a particular interest in English-language literature, graduating from the University of Turin with a thesis on the poetry of Walt Whitman. Among his mentors at the university was Leone Ginzburg, expert on Russian literature and literary critic, husband of the writer Natalia Ginzburg and father of the future historian Carlo Ginzburg. In those years, Pavese translated both classic and recent American and British authors that were then new to the Italian public.

Arrest and conviction; the war in Italy 
Pavese moved in antifascist circles. In 1935 he was arrested and convicted for having letters from a political prisoner. After a few months in prison he was sent into "confino", internal exile in Southern Italy, the commonly used sentence for those guilty of lesser political crimes. (Carlo Levi and Leone Ginzburg, also from Turin, were similarly sent into confino.) After a year spent in the Calabrian village of Brancaleone, Pavese returned to Turin, where he worked for the left-wing publisher Giulio Einaudi as editor and translator. Natalia Ginzburg also worked there.

Pavese was living in Rome when he was called up into the fascist army, but because of his asthma he spent six months in a military hospital. When he returned to Turin, German troops occupied the streets and most of his friends had left to fight as partisans. Pavese fled to the hills around Serralunga di Crea, near Casale Monferrato. He took no part in the armed struggle taking place in that area. During the years in Turin, he was the mentor of the young writer and translator Fernanda Pivano, his former student at the Liceo D'Azeglio. Pavese gave her the American edition of Spoon River Anthology, which came out in Pivano's Italian translation in 1943.

After the war 
After World War II Pavese joined the Italian Communist Party and worked on the party's newspaper, L'Unità. The bulk of his work was published during this time. Toward the end of his life, he would frequently visit Le Langhe, the area where he was born, where he found great solace. Depression, the failure of a brief love affair with the actress Constance Dowling, to whom his last novel and one of his last poems ("Death will come and she'll have your eyes") were dedicated, and political disillusionment led him to his suicide by an overdose of barbiturates in 1950.  That year he had won the Strega Prize for La Bella Estate, comprising three novellas: 'La tenda', written in 1940, 'Il diavolo sulle colline' (1948) and 'Tra donne sole' (1949).

Leslie Fiedler wrote of Pavese's death "...for the Italians, his death has come to have a weight like that of Hart Crane for us, a meaning that penetrates back into his own work and functions as a symbol in the literature of an age." The circumstances of his suicide, which took place in a hotel room, mimic the last scene of Tra Donne Sole (Among Women Only), his penultimate book. His last book was 'La Luna e i Falò', published in Italy in 1950 and translated into English as The Moon and the Bonfires by Louise Sinclair in 1952.

He was an atheist.

Themes in Pavese's works 
The typical protagonist in the works of Pavese is a loner, through choice or through circumstances. Their relationships with men and women tend to be temporary and superficial. They may wish to have more solidarity with other people, but they often end up betraying their ideals and friends; for example, in The Prison, the political exile in a village in Southern Italy receives a note from another political confinato living nearby, who suggests a meeting. The protagonist rejects a show of solidarity and refuses to meet him. The title of the collection of the two novellas is Before the Cock Crows, a reference to Peter's betrayal of Christ before his death.

The Langhe, the area where he spent his summer holidays as a boy, had a great hold on Pavese. It is a land of rolling hills covered in vineyards. It is an area where he felt at home, but he recognised the harsh and brutal lives that poor peasants had making a living from the land. Bitter struggles took place between Germans and partisans in this area. The land became part of Pavese's personal mythology.

In The Moon and the Bonfires, the protagonist tells a story of drinking beer in a bar in America. A man comes in whom he recognizes as being from the valleys of Le Langhe by his way of walking and his outlook. He speaks to him in dialect suggesting a bottle of their local wine would be better than the beer.  After some years in America, the protagonist returns to his home village. He explores Le Langhe with a friend who had remained in the area. He finds out that so many of his contemporaries have died in sad circumstances, some as partisans shot by the Germans, while a notable local beauty had been executed by partisans as a fascist spy.

Books 
 Lavorare stanca (Hard Labor), poems 1936; expanded edition 1943.
See also: 
 Paesi Tuoi (Your Villages), novel 1941.
 La Spiaggia (The Beach), novel 1941.
 Feria d'agosto (August Holiday) 1946.
 Il Compagno (The Comrade), novel 1947.
 Dialoghi con Leucò (Dialogues with Leucò), philosophical dialogues between classical Greek characters, 1947.
 Il diavolo sulle colline (The Devil in the Hills), novel 1948.
 Prima che il gallo canti (Before the Cock Crows), two novellas. La casa in collina (The House on the Hill) and Il carcere (The Prison), 1949.
 La bella estate (The Beautiful Summer), three novellas including Tra donne sole (Women on Their Own), 1949.
 La luna e i falò (The Moon and the Bonfires), novel 1950.
 Verrà la morte e avrà i tuoi occhi (Death Will Come and Have your Eyes), poems, 1951.
 Il mestiere di vivere: Diario 1935–1950, The Business of Living: Diaries 1935–1950 (published in English as The Burning Brand), 1952
 Saggi Letterari, literary essays.
 Racconti, – two volumes of short stories.
 Lettere 1926–1950, – two volumes of letters.
 Disaffections: Complete Poems 1930–1950, translated by Geoffrey Brock. (Copper Canyon Press, 2002)

References

External links 

 Cesare Pavese poems translated into English by Linh Dinh. Milk Magazine
 Of Sea and Words and Toil: The Poetry of Cesare Pavese by Olivier Burckhardt, Quadrant. 48:7/8, (2004) 82–85
  Cesare Pavese and America: Life, Love, and Literature by Lawrence G. Smith

1908 births
1950 suicides
Communist poets
Communist writers
Drug-related suicides in Italy
Barbiturates-related deaths
Italian anti-fascists
Italian Communist Party politicians
Italian literary critics
Italian male poets
Italian diarists
Italian resistance movement members
Italian male short story writers
Marxist journalists
Mythopoeic writers
People from the Province of Cuneo
Writers from Turin
Strega Prize winners
20th-century Italian politicians
University of Turin alumni
20th-century Italian translators
20th-century Italian novelists
20th-century English male writers
20th-century Italian poets
Italian male novelists
20th-century Italian short story writers
English–Italian translators
1950 deaths
Italian atheists
20th-century diarists